The Planters Bank Building is a historic commercial building at 200 East Hale Street in downtown Osceola, Arkansas.  It is a Classical Revival brick and mortar structure, designed by Missouri architect Uzell Singleton Branson and built c. 1920.  It is one of the most architecturally sophisticated buildings in the city, which is otherwise dominated by vernacular early 20th-century commercial architecture.  It has housed banks for most of its existence, although it briefly served as city hall in 1943–44.

The building was listed on the National Register of Historic Places in 1987.

See also
National Register of Historic Places listings in Mississippi County, Arkansas

References

Bank buildings on the National Register of Historic Places in Arkansas
Neoclassical architecture in Arkansas
Commercial buildings completed in 1920
National Register of Historic Places in Mississippi County, Arkansas
Individually listed contributing properties to historic districts on the National Register in Arkansas
Osceola, Arkansas
1920 establishments in Arkansas